The 1932–33 Scottish Division One season was won by Rangers by three points over nearest rival Motherwell. Morton and East Stirlingshire finished 19th and 20th respectively and were relegated to the 1933–34 Scottish Division Two.

League table

Results

References

Scottish Football Archive

1932–33 Scottish Football League
Scottish Division One seasons
Scot